The New Breed is the second solo studio album by American hip hop recording artist and producer MC Breed from Flint, Michigan. It was released on April 27, 1993 via Wrap Records with distribution by Ichiban Records. Production was handled by MC Breed, Colin Wolfe, Warren G and The D.O.C. It features guest appearances from 2Pac, DFC, Jibri, Admiral D and Black Ceasar. The New Breed found decent success, making it to #156 on the Billboard 200 and #16 on the Top R&B/Hip-Hop Albums chart in the United States. The album spawned three singles: "Gotta Get Mine", "Tight" and "Everyday Ho"/"Flashbacks". Its lead single, "Gotta Get Mine", reached #96 on the Billboard Hot 100 singles chart, #61 on the Hot R&B/Hip-Hop Songs chart, #6 on the Hot Rap Songs chart, and appeared in 2002 film 8 Mile. Another single, "Tight", made it to #19 on the Hot Rap Songs chart.

Track listing

Personnel
Eric Tyrone Breed – performer, producer
Tupac Amaru Shakur – performer (tracks: 3, 5)
Dale Jabrigar – performer (tracks: 1, 7)
Bobby T. Thompson – performer (track 4)
Alpha "Al" Breed – performer (track 10)
Admiral D – performer (track 4)
Black Ceasar – performer (track 4)
Colin Wolfe – producer (tracks: 1-7, 9-12)
Warren Griffin III – producer (tracks: 3, 5, 7-8)
Tracy Lynn Curry – producer (tracks: 2, 11)

Charts

References

External links

1993 albums
MC Breed albums
Albums produced by Warren G
G-funk albums